Messmate is a common name for a group of species of tree in the plant genus Eucalyptus, all of which have rough bark. The name is of uncertain origin.

Species commonly known as "messmate" include:
 E. acmenoides (yellow messmate)
 E. cloeziana (messmate, Gympie messmate, Queensland messmate, yellow messmate)
 E. exserta (messmate, yellow messmate)
 E. macta (red messmate)
 E. obliqua (messmate, messmate stringybark)
 E. resinifera (red messmate)
 E. robertsonii (messmate, New South Wales messmate)
 E. robusta (swamp messmate)
 E. tetradonta (messmate)

References

Eucalyptus